Cashmore is a small town west of Portland in southern Victoria, Australia. It had a population of 197 at the 2021 census.

Reference List

Towns in Victoria (Australia)